Norman Albert Gall  (born 30 September 1942) is an English former professional footballer who made more than 400 appearances in the Football League playing as a defender for Brighton & Hove Albion.

Life and career
Gall was born in Wallsend, which was then in Northumberland. While completing a marine engineering apprenticeship, he played football as an amateur for Gateshead. In March 1962, he turned professional with Brighton & Hove Albion, about to be relegated to the Football League Third Division. He was initially unpopular because he had displaced captain Roy Jennings from the team, but soon established himself as first-choice centre half and was twice voted Albion's Player of the Season. Over 12 years with the club, he made 440 appearances in the Football League and 488 in all first-team competitions. Albion's long-serving goalkeeper Brian Powney said Gall "was the best player [he] ever played with because of his consistency over all the years."

After retiring from professional football, Gall remained in the Sussex area, playing non-League football for clubs including Horsham, Eastbourne United and Southwick and coaching at Worthing. He also acted as summariser on BBC Radio Sussex commentaries on Brighton matches.

References

1942 births
Living people
Sportspeople from Wallsend
Footballers from Tyne and Wear
English footballers
Association football defenders
Gateshead F.C. players
Brighton & Hove Albion F.C. players
Horsham F.C. players
Eastbourne United F.C. players
Southwick F.C. players
English Football League players